Nabji (མནའ་སྦྱིས། in Dzongkha) is a village in Trongsa District in central Bhutan.

Geography

The Nabji village sits on the south-west lap of a subsidiary mountain which originates from the Black Mountains (Bhutan) range. The village falls within the heart of the Jigme Singye Wangchuck National Park. A river which is called as Zhillingchhu flows from the southern side of the village.

History and etymology
The place name "Nabji" came from Na Boe which literally means taking an oath. It is believed that in the 8th century Guru Rinpoche mediated peace between two Kings in this place and made them to take an oath to never create problems in future. A temple which stands by this name still exists in this village.

References

Populated places in Bhutan